Robert Pierce (born August 1, 1960) is a former professional basketball head coach for Hitachi, Shiga, Akita, and Sendai in Japan and a former college basketball assistant coach for University of Southern California. He can speak English, Japanese, Spanish, Chinese and Korean languages. Currently he is a Director of Instruction for the Five-Star Sports China, coaches the international school of Beijing men's basketball team, and serves for the Miami Heat of the NBA as the scout in China.

Head coaching record

|- 
| style="text-align:left;"|Hitachi
| style="text-align:left;"|1999-00
| 16||5||11|||| |||||||||
| 
|- 
| style="text-align:left;"|Hitachi
| style="text-align:left;"|2000-01
| 21||6||15||||style="text-align:center;"|7th |||||||||
|style="text-align:center;"|Missed playoffs
|- 
| style="text-align:left;"|Shiga
| style="text-align:left;"|2008-09
| 52||19||33|||| style="text-align:center;"|5th in Western|||0||0||0||
| style="text-align:center;"|Missed playoffs
|- 
| style="text-align:left;"|Shiga
| style="text-align:left;"|2009-10
| 52||29||23|||| style="text-align:center;"|4th in Western|||2||0||2||
| style="text-align:center;"|Lost in First Round
|-
| style="text-align:left;"|Akita
| style="text-align:left;"|2010-11
|50||18||32|||| style="text-align:center;"|6th in Eastern|||2||0||2||
| style="text-align:center;"|Lost in First Round
|-
| style="text-align:left;"|Sendai
| style="text-align:left;"|2011-12
| 52||25||27|||| style="text-align:center;"|6th in Eastern|||3||1||2||
| style="text-align:center;"|Lost in First Round
|-
| style="text-align:left;"|Sendai
| style="text-align:left;"|2012-13
| 34||13||21|||| style="text-align:center;"|Fired|||0||0||0||
| style="text-align:center;"|
|-

|- class="sortbottom"
! style="text-align:center;" colspan="2" | Bj league totals
! 240||104||136|||| ||7||1||6||||

References

1960 births
Living people
Akita Northern Happinets coaches
Basketball coaches from Oregon
American basketball scouts
Biola University alumni
Cleveland Cavaliers scouts
High school basketball coaches in the United States
Miami Heat scouts
Sendai 89ers coaches
Shiga Lakes coaches
Sportspeople from Portland, Oregon
Tokyo Excellence coaches
USC Trojans men's basketball coaches